Carabus abbreviatus is a species of ground beetle in the large genus Carabus.

References

abbreviatus
Insects described in 1835
Taxa named by Gaspard Auguste Brullé